This is a list of tracks which have hosted a NASCAR race from 1948 to present. Various forms of race track have been used throughout the history of NASCAR, including purpose-built race tracks such as Daytona to the mysteries of Air Base Speedway.

NASCAR National series race tracks 
The following is a list of race tracks currently used by NASCAR as part of its NASCAR Cup Series, NASCAR Xfinity Series, or NASCAR Gander RV & Outdoors Truck Series for the 2022 racing season.

Key to table
 Track: The name of the facility.
 Miles: Length of the course.
 Configuration: Shape of the course.
 Location: Geographical location of the track.
 Series: NASCAR national series currently hosted by the track. Numbers in parentheses indicate if the course holds more than one series event during the season.
 Seating: Number of seats for spectators at the track, if known.
 Races: Feature races for the top national series that race there.
 Lights: If the track has lights, the column will say yes, otherwise no.
 Bold Font: Indicates exhibition race.

Track table

Defunct or inactive regular NASCAR tracks 
The following tables list all of the tracks previously used by NASCAR at least two times. Most of these racetracks are now closed or demolished.

Key to tables 
Track: Name of the track. Either the current name of the track (as it exists today) or the last known name of the track is shown.
Type and layout: Approximate course length (in miles), shape, and surface type. For course length, the last known measurement provided by NASCAR is shown. Note that this figure may differ in various sources depending on the method that NASCAR or other sanctioning bodies have used to measure the track.
Location: The state (or province, for Canadian tracks) and city (or nearest city) where each track is located.
Named race(s): For many years, specific names have been given to races during a given season as a way of marketing the event. Where these names are known, they are noted next to the seasons in which that name was used.
Season(s): NASCAR seasons in which the track hosted an event. Note that only points-paying races are counted as part of a given series' season; tracks where additional exhibition or special races have been held are included in a separate table.
Notes: Any additional information or clarification that may be useful. This includes details on the track's current status, or whether the track saw further use in other NASCAR series.
Permanently closed or demolished tracks are marked with grey background.

Road and street courses

Paved intermediate tracks and superspeedways

Paved short tracks

Dirt oval tracks

Tracks used one time for NASCAR event 
The following table shows all tracks that had only one single event in NASCAR and were not visited again. Some racetracks are temporary and were built on airfields or fairgrounds or in stadiums.

Other tracks used by NASCAR 
This table includes tracks used by NASCAR solely for exhibition races or other special events that were not part of any regular NASCAR season.

See also
Short track motor racing
List of motor racing venues by capacity
Tourist attractions in the United States

References

External links
List of every NASCAR track at Racing-Reference
Track info table at Driver Average
Link to RacingCircuits.info (Track Maps)

NASCAR
NASCAR
Tracks